Étude Op. 25, No. 12 in C minor is the last of Frédéric Chopin's formal studies for the piano, opus 25, dedicated À Madame la Comtesse d'Agoult. It was first published in 1837 in French, German, and English. In the first French edition, the time signature is 4/4, but most recent editions of this piece follow the manuscript and German editions, which indicate cut time. This work is a series of rising and falling arpeggios in various chord progressions from C minor. In addition, its opening bars recall the chord structure of the opening bars of the second prelude of the first book of The Well-Tempered Clavier by Johann Sebastian Bach.

It is often referred to as the “Ocean” etude.

Structure 
The entire work, except the coda, consists wholly of semiquaver (sixteenth note) arpeggios, spanning large lengths of the keyboard in the space of one bar. The initial theme is expounded upon and changes to many different keys. The climax resolves to C major.

See also 
 Prelude and Fugue in C minor, BWV 847 - has similar chord structure at the beginning

Notes

External links 

 
 Op. 25, No. 12 played by Alfred Cortot
 Op. 25, No. 12 played by Claudio Arrau
 Op. 25, No. 12 played by Vladimir Ashkenazy
 Op. 25, No. 12 played by Maurizio Pollini
 Op. 25, No. 12 played by Grigory Sokolov

25 12
1836 compositions
Compositions in C minor